Okaloosa County School District is a public school district that covers Okaloosa County, Florida. The district has its headquarters in Fort Walton Beach, Florida. The current superintendent of schools is Marcus Daniel Chambers.

History
Until the integration of public schools, a separate school system was maintained for white students and black students. The first colored school in Crestview was built in 1926, and named Crestview School. In 1945, Crestview Colored High School was built on School Avenue. It was renamed Carver School after George Washington Carver, and eventually Carver-Hill School in honor of African-American education advocate Ed Hill.

School Board  

District 1 –  Dr. Lamar White (Second term is from 2018–2022)
District 2 – Dewey Destin (Second term is from 2016–2020)
District 3 – Linda Evanchyk (First term is from 2018–2022)
District 4 – Tim Bryant (First term is from 2016–2020)
District 5 – Diane Kelley (First term is from 2018–2022)

Okaloosa County school board members are subject to an unlimited number of four year terms.

Schools

High schools
Baker School (Gator) 
Choctawhatchee High School (Indian) 
Crestview High School (Bulldog) 
Fort Walton Beach High School (Viking) 
(Laurel Hill School) (Hobo)
Niceville High School (Eagle)
Choice High School and Technical Center (No mascot)

Middle schools
Baker School(Gator)
Bruner Middle School 
Davidson Middle School (Panthers)
Destin Middle School 
Laurel Hill School 
Lewis School 
Meigs Middle School    
Northwest Florida Ballet Academie (3–8) 
Okaloosa STEMM Center 
Pryor Middle School 
Ruckel Middle School (Rams)
Shoal River Middle School (Mustangs)

Elementary schools
Antioch Elementary School 
Baker School 
Bluewater Elementary School 
Bob Sikes Elementary School 
Destin Elementary School 
Edge Elementary School 
Edwins Elementary School 
Eglin Elementary School 
Elliott Point Elementary School 
Florosa Elementary School 
Kenwood Elementary School 
Laurel Hill School 
Lewis School 
Longwood Elementary School 
Mary Esther Elementary School 
Northwest Florida Ballet Academie (3–8) 
Northwood Elementary School 
Oakland Elementary School K-6 (Mary Ester Cut-Off/Carol Av built 60s Closed 80s)
Plew Elementary School 
Shalimar Elementary School 
Walker Elementary School 
Wright Elementary School

Charter/contract schools
AMIkids Emerald Coast 
Destin High School
Liza Jackson Preparatory School 
Okaloosa Academy – FWB Campus 
The Collegiate High School of NWFSC

Alternative schools
Gulf Coast Youth Academy 
Okaloosa Regional Detention Center 
Okaloosa Youth Academy 
Okaloosa Youth Development Center

References

External links
 

 
School districts in Florida
Education in Okaloosa County, Florida
Government agencies with year of establishment missing